Amt Oderberg was an Amt ("collective municipality") in the district of Barnim, in Brandenburg, Germany. Its seat was in the town Oderberg. It was merged with the Amt Britz-Chorin to form the Amt Britz-Chorin-Oderberg in January 2009.

The Amt Oderberg consisted of the following municipalities:
Hohensaaten
Liepe
Lunow-Stolzenhagen
Oderberg
Parsteinsee

Oderberg
Barnim